"I Wanna Hear Your Heartbeat (Sunday Girl)" is a song by Bad Boys Blue from their second studio album Heartbeat. Released as a single in late 1986, it reached number 14 in West Germany and number 21 in Switzerland.

Composition 
The song was written and produced by Tony Hendrik and Karin Hartmann (as Karin van Haaren).

Charts

References 

1986 songs
1986 singles
Bad Boys Blue songs
Songs written by Tony Hendrik